Cnemaspis gunawardanai, or Gunawardana's day gecko, is a species of diurnal rupicolous gecko endemic to island of Sri Lanka.

Taxonomy
The species is closely resembling C. rajakarunai, C. hitihamii, and other congeners of the alwisi group.

Etymology
The specific name gunawardanai'' is named in honor of Dr. Jagath Gunawardana. He is a leading environmental activist, conservationist, and a lawyer contributed to popularizing environmental laws among the general public.

Description
An adult male is 37.4 mm long. Dorsum homogeneous with keeled granular scales. There are four spine-like tubercles on flanks. Dorsum patterned with creamy and yellowish vertebral markings on a uniform dark brown background. Snout is light brown. There is a black spot on the neck. A a vertebral cream stripe shading visible posteriorly. Arms and legs uniform dark brown with pale and dark blotches. Tail is dark brown with six pale yellow markings.

Ecology
The gecko found only from two localities: Pilikuttuwa and Maligatenna, Gampaha district. Entirely wild species, it is commonly inhabited in dry, shaded, cool surfaces of rock outcrops inside caves. The researchers suggested critically endangered IUCN category for the species due to regional endemism.

References

Reptiles of Sri Lanka
gunawardanai
Reptiles described in 2021